John N. Tsitsiklis (born 1958) is a Clarence J. Lebel Professor of Electrical Engineering with the Department of Electrical Engineering and Computer Science (EECS) at the Massachusetts Institute of Technology. He serves as the director of the Laboratory for Information and Decision Systems and is affiliated with the Institute for Data, Systems, and Society (IDSS), the Statistics and Data Science Center and the MIT Operations Research Center.

Education
Tsitsiklis received a B.S. degree in Mathematics (1980), and his B.S. (1980), M.S. (1981), and Ph.D. (1984) degrees in Electrical Engineering, all from the Massachusetts Institute of Technology in Cambridge, Massachusetts.

Awards and honors
Tsitsiklis was elected to the 2007 class of Fellows of the Institute for Operations Research and the Management Sciences.

He won the "2016 ACM SIGMETRICS Achievement Award in recognition of his fundamental contributions to decentralized control and consensus, approximate dynamic programming and statistical learning."

In 2018 he won the IEEE Control Systems Award "for contributions to the theory and application of optimization in large dynamic and distributed systems" as well as the John von Neumann Theory Prize, with Dimitri Bertsekas, "for contributions to Parallel and Distributed Computation as well as Neurodynamic Programming."

External links 
 Publications and citations from Google Scholar.
 Publications from DBLP.

References

1958 births
Living people
Massachusetts Institute of Technology School of Science alumni
MIT School of Engineering alumni
Greek electrical engineers
Fellows of the Institute for Operations Research and the Management Sciences
Engineers from Thessaloniki